Muhammed Nemil Valiyattil (born 18 March 2002) is an Indian professional footballer who plays as an attacking midfielder for Indian Super League club Goa.

Club career

Youth and early career with RFYC 
Born in Kozhikode, Kerala, Nemil started playing football through V. P. Sathyan Soccer Academy at the age of ten. In 2015, he was scouted by Reliance Foundation Young Champs (RFYC) academy as a part of a nationwide young talent hunt. His dribbling skill, passing accuracy and two-footed shooting ability earned him praises at the RFYC in Navi Mumbai. In his first three years at RFYC, Nemil registered 45 goals and 31 assists across various youth level competitions. His strong performances earned him trips to England in 2016 and Japan in 2018, where the RFYC took on the local teams there.

Nemil won the Best Player Award at the 2018 U-17 Subroto Cup, was also named the Mumbai District Football Association Super Division's best midfielder in 2019. He won the 2019 Vedanta Youth Cup with RFYC team as he scored the winner in the final against Bengaluru FC and awarded another Player of the Tournament title. In March 2019, RFYC sent Nemil to Marcet High-performance academy in Spain, on his consistent display of quality with the academy. During his time in Spain, Nemil had a successful trail at Barcelona-based club FE Grama.

FC Goa 
On 20 October 2020, FC Goa announced that the club had reached an agreement with RFYC for the transfer of Nemil. He joined the Indian Super League club on a four-year deal.

Loan to FE Grama 
After joining Goa, Nemail was sent back to Spain for joining FE Grama on a season-long loan.  He played 11 games for FE Grama U19s in the Liga Nacional Juvenil and scored 7 goals including 2 hat-tricks. Promoted to the senior team, Nemil made his debut against CP San Cristóbal in the Tercera División.

Return to Goa 
After his successful loan spell with FE Grama, Nemil returned to Goa ahead of the 2021–22 Indian Super League season. On 7 September 2021, he made his debut as a substitute in a 2–0 2021 Durand Cup group stage win over Army Green. On 13 September, he scored his first goal for the club against Sudeva Delhi. Goa defeated Mohammedan 1–0 in the 2021 Durand Cup Final to win the competition for the first time in club history, with Nemil registering four goals and two assists from six appearances. On 4 December, he made his ISL debut as a substitute for Princeton Rebello against NorthEast United.

Career statistics

Club

Honours 
Goa
Durand Cup: 2021

See also 
List of Indian football players in foreign leagues

References

External links 
Muhammed Nemil Valiyattil at the-aiff.com

2002 births
Living people
Sportspeople from Kozhikode
Indian footballers
Footballers from Kerala
Association football midfielders
Indian Super League players
Indian expatriate footballers
Expatriate footballers in Spain